Rebecca Whitley (born March 18, 1980) is an American politician who has served in the New Hampshire Senate from the 15th district since 2020. A Democrat, she represents the state capital, Concord, as well as Hopkinton, Henniker, and Warner.

Before serving as a senator, Whitley worked as an attorney for the New Hampshire Disability Rights Center, a consultant for the Environmental Defense Fund, and the Policy Director for the Children's Behavioral Health Collaborative. She resides in Hopkinton with her husband and son.

New Hampshire Senate 
Following Senate Majority Leader Dan Feltes' retirement to run for governor, Democrats including Whitley and former congressman Paul Hodes sought the Democratic nomination for his seat. In the September 8th primary, Whitley won the nomination. She went on to win the general election.

While in the Senate, Whitley has co-sponsored legislation to ban no-knock warrants, limit the usage of school resource officers, and increase the state minimum wage. She supports reproductive freedom, the expansion of Medicaid, clean energy policies, and state education funding reform.

For the 2020-2022 term, Whitley has been assigned to the Administrative Rules committee, the Health and Human Services committee, and the Judiciary committee.

Electoral history

References 

Democratic Party New Hampshire state senators
Living people
People from Hopkinton, New Hampshire
1980 births